Amygdalopita is an almond cake in Greek cuisine made with ground almonds, flour, butter, eggs and pastry cream. It is one of the most common glyka tapsiou - dessert dishes like pies and breads baked in baking pans. Other common desserts of this style are galaktoboureko, karydopita and kadaifi.

Preparation

To make this cake the dry ingredients are slowly folded into creamed butter and sugar, then the eggs are beaten in. The cake is baked in a tray and soaked in simple syrup after its done baking and allowed to cool before it is cut into individual square pieces.

See also
 List of cakes
 Basbousa

References

External links 

 AMYGDALOPITA (GREEK NUT CAKE)

Greek desserts
Almond desserts
Butter cakes